Warren Lyford DeLano (June 21, 1972 – November 3, 2009) was an advocate for the increased adoption of open source practices in the sciences, and especially drug discovery, where advances which save time and resources can also potentially save lives.

Biography

Born in Philadelphia on June 21, 1972, DeLano was educated at Yale University, where he helped produce campus humor magazine The Yale Record.

In 2000, he launched the PyMOL open-source molecular viewer in an attempt to demonstrate the practical impact open source might have on discovery of new medicines. Since then, PyMOL has been widely adopted for molecular structure visualization within the pharmaceutical industry and at public sector research institutions.

In 2003, DeLano founded DeLano Scientific LLC to commercialize PyMOL and conduct an experiment in the "laboratory of the market" regarding the commercial viability of an open source software company. His hypothesis was that open source software is intrinsically optimal for science, and that scientific software companies which provide open source solutions will, through free market competition, eventually displace companies that favor proprietary solutions.

Delano was married to Beth Pehrson.

He died by suicide on 3 November 2009 at his home in Palo Alto, California.

In 2009 the American Society for Biochemistry and Molecular Biology created the DeLano Award for Computational Biosciences in Warren's honor. The award acknowledges a scientist for the most accessible and innovative development or application of computer technology to enhance research in the life sciences at the molecular level.

Public quotes

References

2009 deaths
American bioinformaticians
1972 births
Scientists from Philadelphia